is a yonkoma manga series by Takako Aonuma which ran in the Fujinseikatsusha child-raising magazine Petit Enfant. The manga was adapted to a 52-episode anime television series which ran on the MBS and TBS networks (except for TV Yamaguchi) from September 2, 1995 through August 31, 1996. The series is sometimes called Mama Poyo.

The series follows the "adventures" of a young mother and father as they deal with the joys and challenges of raising small children. The "poyopoyo" in the title is an onomatopoeia for the young children "toddling" around (or walking unsteadily).

Books

Manga, first release
Volume 1: 
Volume 2: 
Volume 3: 
Volume 4:

Manga, second release
Volume 1: 
Volume 2: 
Volume 3:

Toilet training book
 This book was written by Eiichi Hoashi, a well-known child psychologist in Japan. Aonuma wrote the accompanying manga used to illustrate the various ideas and techniques presented in the book.
The Battle to Get Two-year-old Ann Out of Diapers: Mama Poyo Special: Going to Undies in Four Steps,

Anime picture books
Volume 1: 
Volume 2: 
Volume 3: 
Volume 4: 
Volume 5: ISBN
Volume 6: ISBN
Volume 7: ISBN
Volume 8: ISBN
Volume 9: 
Volume 10: 
Volume 11: 
Volume 12:

Anime

Cast
In the manga, the names of the characters are the real names of the Aonuma family, but in the anime, they were given new names. Following are names used in the anime:
Hyōga Poyota: Yuri Shiratori (5 years old, boy, in oldest class in pre-school)
Jura Poyota: Satomi Kōrogi (3 years old, girl, in youngest class in pre-school)
Miki Poyota: Rica Matsumoto (Mom, housewife and picture book author)
Gendai Poyota: Yūichi Nagashima (Dad, salaryman, called "Darling" by Miki)

Other characters:
Emi Kunitachi: Kumiko Nishihara
Reira Kunitachi: Hinako Kanamaru
Yū Kunitachi: Fujiko Takimoto
Employee B: Wakana Yamazaki

Staff
Original creator: Takako Aonuma
Director: Takayoshi Suzuki
Script: Mamiko Ikeda, Minori Ikeno, Tomoko Ishizuka
Producers: Hiroshi Nishikiori, Fūta Morita, Jōhei Matsuura, Shinya Hanai, Masahiro Hosoda, others
Character designs: Tatsuo Miura
Animation director: Tatsuo Miura, Hiroshi Oikawa, Shinichirō Kajiura, Hirokazu Ishino, others
Background artist: Gōichi Kudō
Art director: Satoshi Suzuki
Music: Kazunori Maruyama
Sound effects: Mitsuru Kageyama (Fizz Sound Creation)
Audio production: San'onkyō
Production: MBS, Nippon Animation
Writing: Takako Aonuma, MBS, Nippon Animation

Theme songs

Opening
Beeper Love
Vocals: Now
Lyrics: Umedy
Composer: Cake-K
Arrangement: Shige

Ending
 (acoustic version)
Vocals: Masatoshi Ono
Lyrics: Masatoshi Ono
Composer: Tsukasa
Arrangement: Yoshio Tsuru

Vocals: Rica Matsumoto
Lyrics: Rui Serizawa
Composer: Kazuyoshi Shina
Arrangement: Tatsuya Nishiwaki

External links
 Official Mama Poyo page
 

1995 anime television series debuts
Mainichi Broadcasting System original programming
Nippon Animation
Anime series based on manga
Books about parenting
TBS Television (Japan) original programming
Yonkoma